Asim K. Duttaroy is an Indian-born American medical scientist who, since 2001, works as a Professor at the Faculty of Medicine, University of Oslo, Norway. He was born in Gopinagar (Gangnapur), Nadia district, West Bengal, India.

Duttaroy is the author of over 350 research papers and book chapters, has authored or edited several books, and also holds several international patents. His research contributions have led to several industrial developments worldwide such as Provexis. Duttaroy, while he worked as Professor (1990-2001) at the Rowett Research Institute at the University of Aberdeen, Scotland, United Kingdom, discovered that an extract from tomato had a positive effect in the prevention of blood platelet aggregation.

Another area of his research has been the investigation of the fatty acid transport system in human placenta and its roles in placental preferential transfer of critically important nutrients such as docosahexaenoic acid,22:6n-3 (DHA) and arachidonic acid,20:4n-6 (ARA) from the mother to the fetus.

Duttaroy serves as Editor-In-Chief of the peer reviewed journal Food & Nutrition Research, which has an Impact factor of  3.89 (2020). Duttaroy serves on the editorial boards of several other journals, including Prostaglandins Leukotrienes and Essential Fatty Acids, Nutrients, and European Journal of Lipid Science and Technology.

Legacy 
Duttaroy’s research focuses on how the placenta transports maternal plasma DHA and ARA  to the fetus. The fetal brain development in utero is critically dependent on the maternal supply of these fatty acids in the utero. His studies have been documented through several articles. Besides, his articles have drawn many citations (Google Scholar PubMed). 
His other research area is cardioprotective factors in fruits and vegetables. He has discovered the anti-platelet factors from tomatoes. This discovery made by him is now widely known as Fruitflow. In 2009, Fruitflow® became the first product in Europe to obtain an approved, proprietary health claim under Article 13(5) of the European Health Claims Regulation 1924/2006 on nutrition and health claims made on foods. The EU Commission authorized the health claim “water-soluble tomato concentrate (WSTC) I and II help maintain normal platelet aggregation, which contributes to healthy blood flow.”. Fruitflow® is now widely available in different countries worldwide.

Books

References 

Living people
Indian emigrants to the United States
American medical researchers
American nutritionists
1955 births
Scientists from West Bengal